The 1996–97 Categoría Primera A season, known as Copa Mustang 1996–97 for sponsoring purposes, was the 50th season of the Categoría Primera A, Colombia's top-flight football league. The season started on 8 September 1996 and ended on 21 December 1997. América de Cali were the champions, winning their ninth domestic league title after beating the Torneo Adecuación winners Atlético Bucaramanga in the championship playoff.

Deportivo Cali were the defending champions, but placed last in both the final group stage and the Adecuación semi-finals and thus failed to qualify for the finals of the competition.

Format 
The season, which was originally to last from September 1996 to June 1997, was initially split into three stages: the Apertura and Finalización tournaments, and the final group:
 In the Apertura tournament, played from September to February, the 16 teams played each other under a double round-robin format with two additional rounds of regional derbies for a total of 32 matches. Bonus points were awarded to the top four teams, with the first-placed side being awarded 2 bonus points, the runner-up 1 point, the third-placed team 0.5 points, and the fourth-placed team receiving 0.25 points. In addition to this, the team topping the table at the end of the tournament would be assured of a berth in the 1998 Copa CONMEBOL.
 The Finalización tournament, played from February to April, had 14 rounds with the teams being divided into two groups of eight, made up according to the placements of teams in the previous stage with odd-placed sides in one group and even-placed teams in the other one. An aggregate table considering the results of both tournaments was used to decide the four teams that would advance to the final stage, with no bonus points being awarded. The bottom-placed team in the aggregate table would be relegated to Categoría Primera B.
 The final group was played by the top four teams in the aggregate table, which played each other twice for a total of 6 rounds. All teams started this round at 0 points, expect for the top team in the aggregate table, which started with 1 point.

However, in January 1997 the Assembly of DIMAYOR approved the return of the league to the calendar year format, while also deciding that the season's champion would be defined in December rather than June as originally expected. Because of this, an additional tournament known as Torneo Adecuación was played from July to December 1997:
 In the first stage, the 16 teams were first split into two groups of eight where they played each one of their group rivals twice, and later into four groups of four where they played six additional matches. Bonus points were awarded to teams in both stages, and teams carried over their first stage performance to this second phase with the top eight teams advancing to the semi-final stage, whilst the bottom-placed side was relegated.
 In the semi-finals, the qualified teams were split into two groups of four with the winners of each group playing a final series over two legs to decide the Adecuación tournament winners, whilst the two group-runners up played a play-off series to qualify for the Copa CONMEBOL along with the Adecuación runners-up.
 Penalty shootouts were played in matches ending in draws, with the winning side earning an additional point.

The Adecuación winners would then play the winners of the final group (América de Cali) in another double-legged series to decide the season champions. In the event that both teams tied on points at the end of the second leg of the finals, a tiebreaker match on neutral ground would be played. Both season finalists qualified for the 1998 Copa Libertadores.

Teams 
16 teams originally competed in the season, the top 15 teams of the 1995–96 season and Cúcuta Deportivo, who were promoted as champions of the 1995–96 Categoría Primera B tournament, replacing Atlético Huila who were relegated at the end of the previous season. Cúcuta Deportivo were relegated to the second tier at the end of the Finalización tournament, being replaced by the 1996–97 Primera B champions Deportivo Unicosta for the Adecuación tournament, which brought the number of clubs that took part in the season up to 17.

Torneo Apertura 
The Torneo Apertura (also known as Copa Mustang I) began on 8 September 1996 and ended on 23 February 1997.

Standings

Torneo Finalización 
The Torneo Finalización (also known as Copa Mustang II) began on 26 February 1997 and ended on 20 April 1997. An aggregate table known as Reclasificación including the games of both tournaments (Apertura and Finalización) was used to determine the teams that would advance to the Copa Mustang final stage, as well as the first team to be relegated to Categoría Primera B for the following season.

Aggregate table

Final group 
In the third stage of the tournament, the four qualified teams played each other under a double round-robin system with the team with the most points at the end of this stage advancing to the championship playoff and qualifying for the 1998 Copa Libertadores.

Torneo Adecuación 
The Torneo Adecuación began on 10 July 1997 and ended on 13 December 1997.

First group stage

Group A

Group B

Second group stage

Group A

Group B

Group C

Group D

Semi-finals 
In the third stage of the tournament, the eight qualified teams were split into two groups, and played each one of the other teams in their group under a double round-robin system with the teams with the most points in each group at the end of this stage advancing to the final. The group runners-up advanced to the third place play-off.

Group A

Group B

Third place play-off 

Tied 3–3 on points, Millonarios won on bonus points and qualified for the 1998 Copa CONMEBOL. Millonarios eventually declined to take part in the Copa CONMEBOL upon being invited to compete in the 1998 Copa Merconorte, thus yielding the berth to Once Caldas.

Finals 

Atlético Bucaramanga won 4–1 on points, advanced to the championship playoff and qualified for the 1998 Copa Libertadores. Deportes Quindío qualified for the 1998 Copa CONMEBOL.

Championship playoff 

América de Cali won 6–0 on points.

Top goalscorers 

Source: Historia del Fútbol Profesional Colombiano 70 Años

References

External links 
 Dimayor official website
 Colombia 1996/97 RSSSF

Categoría Primera A seasons
1
1
Col
Col